Swan Miara (ساون میرا) is a village and union council (an administrative subdivision) of Mansehra District in Khyber-Pakhtunkhwa province of Pakistan. It is located in the south of the district where it borders Abbottabad District.

Formerly it was a part of the Princely State of Amb.

References

Union councils of Mansehra District
Populated places in Mansehra District